Patri Vergara is a professor in physiology at the veterinary faculty at the Universidad Autónoma de Barcelona, Spain, and in 2011, was elected the first woman president of the International Council for Laboratory Animal Science.

Life and career 
Patri Vergara was born in Embid de Ariza, Zaragoza (Spain) and graduated as a Doctor in Veterinary Medicine at Zaragoza University in 1978, and  received a PhD in veterinary science in 1983. In 1987, she was appointed senior lecturer in physiology at the Universitat Autònoma de Barcelona, Spain and became a professor in physiology in 2009.

Research 
Vergara has published over 80 research papers in three main areas: the role of nitric oxide as the main inhibitory neurotransmitter in the gut; the role of gastrointestinal hormones (CCK, GLP-1) in the regulation of gastrointestinal motility; and the mechanisms involved in the development of inflammatory bowel disease with special attention to mast cells  and NGF

Laboratory Animal Science (LAS) 
In 1991,  Vergara was nominated by the Spanish Society for Laboratory Animal Science (SECAL) as their scientific representative to the International Council for Laboratory Animal Science (ICLAS). She was later elected by the ICLAS General Assembly to serve on the ICLAS governing board as treasurer from 1999 to 2003 and then as the first woman ICLAS secretary general from 2003 to 2007. In 2011, she  was elected ICLAS's first woman president.

Education and training 
Vergara co-founded the European College for Laboratory Animal Medicine (ECLAM) in 2000, and she served as a council member and treasurer  until 2007. She was also a member of the management board of the Federation of European Laboratory Animal Science Associations (FELASA) from 1994 to 2011 and chair of the FELASA Accreditation Board for Training and Education in Laboratory Animal Science from 2005 to 2014.

Since 2000, she has been principal coordinator of a postgraduate training course and master's degree in LAS at the Universitat Autònoma de Barcelona, and in 2014, was instrumental in the  creation of a postgraduate training course in LAS at the Tamil Nadu Veterinary and Animal Sciences University (TANUVAS) in India.

Since 2014, she has served as the Spanish government's representative on the European Platform for Education and Training in Laboratory Animal Science (ETPLAS)

References 

Year of birth missing (living people)
Living people
Spanish women scientists
Women veterinary scientists
20th-century women scientists
21st-century women scientists
Academic staff of the Autonomous University of Barcelona
Spanish veterinarians